Lori Sims is an American pianist.

After winning the Gold Medal at the 1998 Gina Bachauer International Piano Competition, Lori Sims performed throughout North America, Europe, and China including engagements with the NordDeutscheRadio Orchester in Hannover, Israel Philharmonic, Indianapolis Symphony, Utah Symphony, and Malta. Sims was also named Classical Fellow of the American Pianists Association in 1993.

Her album of William Bolcom sonatas with violinist Renata Artman Knific received 5 stars from BBC Music Magazine and Allmusic wrote "For anyone unfamiliar with the violin sonatas of William Bolcom, or who has heard them but do not own this particular recording, stop what you're doing and buy it…This CD is absolutely a necessary addition to virtually any collection and is recommended without reservation" and "It is really, really good."

Sims is currently a Professor of Music at Western Michigan University.

References

Living people
American women classical pianists
American classical pianists
Prize-winners of the Gina Bachauer International Piano Competition
21st-century classical pianists
21st-century American women pianists
21st-century American pianists
Year of birth missing (living people)